4-NEMD is a potent sedative drug which acts as a selective alpha-2 adrenergic agonist. It is closely related to dexmedetomidine but is several times more potent. Like other alpha-2 agonists, it produces sedative and muscle relaxant effects but without producing respiratory depression. It is not currently used in medicine but has been researched as the basis for a potential new generation of alpha-2 agonist drugs, which may have selectivity for the different subtypes of the alpha-2 receptor. It has two isomers, with the (S) isomer being the more potent, as with medetomidine. 4-NEMD was also investigated by the United States military as an anaesthetic agent, most likely for use in surgery but possibly also for use as a non-lethal incapacitating agent, although this has not been officially confirmed.

References 

Alpha-2 adrenergic receptor agonists
Imidazoles
1-Naphthyl compounds